Klubi i Basketbollit Prishtina (English: Basketball Club Prishtina), officially known as Sigal Prishtina due to sponsorship reasons, is a Kosovar professional basketball club based in Pristina.

The team currently competes in the  IP Superliga e Basketbollit, Balkan International Basketball League (BIBL) and the FIBA Europe Cup. They are the most successful club in Kosovo, having won 14 national championships, 15 national cups and 7 supercups in the last 14 years. Since 2013 the club has competed in the Balkan International Basketball League (BIBL), and they became the first Kosovar side to win the competition first in 2014–15 after defeating Bulgarian side BC Rilski Sportist in the finals. They would win the same competition the following season in 2015–16 in which they would beat Montenegrin side Mornar Bar in the final, to win this competition back to back as the only Kosovan Basketball club in the history at this competition. In 2015, Prishtina joined the newly formed European second tier competition, the FIBA Europe Cup. They became the first Kosovar Basketball club to reach the round of 16 in the FIBA Europe Cup in the 2018–19 season, winning six matches in their 14 match long campaign. Prishtina has won 15 games in European basketball competitions so far.

History
The club was founded in 1970 but the club had racked up huge debt by 2004, which led to the original club being forced to fold and a new club under the name OJQ KB Prishtina was formed in its place. The debts were then inherited by the new club and they were not dealt with, which led to the club folding once again on 22 September 2011 and a new club was once again formed in its place.

In the 2015–16 season, Prishtina made its debut in the FIBA Europe Cup and became the first Kosovo team to play in a European club competition. Since then, Prishtina competed in every season of the FIBA Europe Cup.

European competitions
In the 2013–14 season, Prishtina played its first season in Europe in Balkan International Basketball League (BIBL). In the first season KB Prishtina took the 2nd place during the Regular Season with 11 wins and 5 losses, qualifying for the Final Four. They were organizers of the Final Four 2013–14 of BIBL, but they lost to Galil Gilboa 74–86 in the semifinal, and to Balkan (BUL) 73–79 in the 3rd place game.

In the BIBL Season 2014–15, KB Prishtina won the Trophy of the for the first time Balkan International Basketball League, KB Prishtina faced in the Quarterfinals SCM Craiova they won first away in Romania 73−77 and then at home in Prishtina 70−98 to progress in the Semifinals off this Tournament. In the Semifinals KB Prishtina faced KK Kožuv from Macedonia yet again in this Tournament. At home Prishtina surprised Kožuv and beat them deservedly 85–61 at home in Prishtina especially Edin Bavčić scored 25 points in this Match and Dardan Berisha with six assist points helped Prishtina massively at this stage. Away in Kožuv they lost 86-80 but it was enough to qualify for their first ever Finals in the Balkan International Basketball League. In the finals they meet BC Rilski Sportist they won both matches against BC Rilski Sportist first in Prishtina 74–72, and second in Bulgaria 80–71, to win the Trophy in this Campaign.  Being the only Basketball Club from Kosovo to achieve this feet so far. In 20 matches KB Prishtina achieved 13 wins and only seven losses in the process. 

But in the next BIBL season 2015–16, KB Prishtina would compete again in the Balkan International Basketball League were they faced in the first round KK Kožuv KK Mornar Bar and BC Beroe. In this Round KB Prishtina won 4 Matches and progressed deservedly in the next Round. 

In the 2015-16 season, KB Prishtina played in FIBA Europe Cup for the first time. They failed to qualify for the next round with two wins and sour losses in the Group Stage.

In the FIBA Europe Cup 2016–17 KB  Prishtina faced in the first round Enisey BC Rilski Sportist and Demir İnşaat Büyükçekmece. KB Prishtina did improve in their performances, especially at home. Their only win was a 87–80 at home against Enisey—not enough for KB Prishtina to progress in the next round.

Sponsorship naming
The club has had several denominations through the years due to its sponsorship:
 MEB Prishtina (2002–2003)
 BpB Prishtina (2003–2004)
 Sigal Prishtina (2004–2011, 2012–2018, 2019–present)
 Z-Mobile Prishtina (2018–2019)

Matches in European competitions

Arena
The club play their home games at the smaller of the two arenas in the Pallati i Rinisë dhe Sporteve (Palace of Youth and Sports) which has a capacity of 2,800. The larger arena in the building had a capacity of around 8,000 but it was damaged by a fire on 25 February 2000 and has never been restored fully since.

Honours and titles

Domestic competitions
Kosovo Basketball Superleague
Winners (14): 1991, 2002, 2003, 2006, 2007, 2008, 2009, 2010, 2011, 2014, 2015, 2016, 2017, 2019
Runners-up (6): 1997, 2001, 2004, 2012, 2013, 2018
Kosovo Cup
Winners (15): 2002, 2003, 2005, 2006, 2007, 2008, 2009, 2010, 2013, 2014, 2016, 2017, 2018, 2019, 2021,
Runners-up (3): 2011, 2015, 2023
Kosovo Supercup
Winners (8): 2005, 2012, 2013, 2014, 2018, 2019, 2020, 2022

European and regional competitions
Balkan League 
Winners (2): 2015, 2016

FIBA Europe Cup
FIBA Europe Cup / 2018-19 Round of 16

FIBA Champions League
 2017–18 Basketball Champions League  • First qualifying round / record 0-2
 2018–19 Basketball Champions League • First qualifying round / record 1-1
 2019-20 Basketball Champions League • First qualifying round / record 0-2

Players

Current roster

Depth chart

Head coaches

Notable players

Kosovo & Albania
 Florian Miftari
 Florent Lila
 Malcolm Armstead
 Mikaile Tmušić
 Granit Rugova
 Samir Šaptahović
 Lis Shoshi
 Besim Tafilaj
 Gezim Morina
 Anthony Drejaj
 Aleksander Damo
 Gerti Shima
 Erkand Karaj
 Ersid Ljuca

Europe
 Gjorgji Čekovski
 Pero Blazevski
 Bojan Trajkovski
 Edin Bavčić
 Khalid Boukichou
 Aurimas Kieža
 Denis Krestinin
 Stanimir Marinov
 Andrew Lawrence
 Thomas Massamba
 Andrejs Selakovs
 Nikola Vučurović

United States
 Divine Myles
 Tarvis Williams
 Fuquan Edwin
 K'Zell Wesson
 Khalid El-Amin
 Abdul Shamsid-Deen
 Jamar Anthony Diggs
 Jordan Hulls
 Mohamed Abukar
 Adam Waleskowski
 Jason Washburn
 Mike Moser
 Kyan Anderson

Africa
 Francois Affia
 Gaston Essengue
 Alhaji Mohammed
Asia
 DeMario Mayfield

References

External links

Sigal Prishtina at Eurobasket.com
RealGM at RealGM
Sigal Prishtina at BGbasket.com
KB Prishtina at fans page

Sport in Pristina
Basketball teams established in 1970
Basketball teams in Yugoslavia
Basketball teams in Kosovo